For Zebda's music album, named in reference to this speech, see Le bruit et l'odeur (album).

"Le bruit et l'odeur" refers to a speech given in 1991 by Jacques Chirac, the Mayor of Paris who later became French president; it translates as "noise and smell."

This is an excerpt from the speech:

English translation: How do you want a French worker who works with his wife, who earn together about 15,000 FF and who sees next to his council house, a piled-up family with a father, three or four spouses and twenty kids earning 50,000 FF via benefits, naturally without working... If you add to that the noise and the smell, well the French worker, he goes crazy. And it is not being racist to say this. We no longer have the means of honouring the family regrouping [policy], and we need to finally start the essential debate in this country, as to whether it is moral and normal that foreigners should profit to the same extent as French people, from a national solidarity to which they don't participate, as they pay no taxes.

In this speech, Chirac contrasts the situation of older generations of immigrants (coming from Italy, Spain, Portugal or Poland) to what he considers the current "overdose" of immigration, mostly from Muslim Arabs and Blacks coming from former colonies that once wanted and got their independence from France. He deplores polygamy, family regrouping policy (adopted by his own initiative) in 1976, exaggerated social assistance (assistanat) and also the situation of working-class French who have trouble making ends meet and see next door large immigrant families living in Europe the African way of life, with one man, three or four spouses, and dozens of children, all living off welfare, not working, not contributing to social taxes, and making noises and smells in their council houses.

He then explains that in such conditions, the French worker, without being a racist, is bound to become mad.

This speech became famous when it was sampled in 1995 by the French band Zebda on their hit "Le bruit et l'odeur" from the album of the same name. Three of the seven members of the group Zebda are ethnically Maghrebis, while the rest are ethnically European.

See also
 "Money and the ethnic vote"
 Rivers of Blood speech
 Welfare queen
 Welfare reform

External references 
 Part of Chirac's speech and other quotations

Notes

1991 in France
Jacques Chirac
Politics of France
1991 speeches
Racism in France
Immigration to France